The CCC Shelter, also known as the Combination Shelter, is a historic park shelter located at Pokagon State Park in Jamestown Township, Steuben County, Indiana.  It is a stone and wood building and was constructed by the Civilian Conservation Corps in 1935/36. Although a low, wide roof gives some protection against rain and snow, the shelter is open on its longer west and east sides.  The north and south ends of the structure feature tall fireplaces built with large stones found within the park, individually hewn by the CCC workers.

The shelter is now used for various programs such as the annual Autumn Storytelling or for renting cross-country skis in the winter. 

Many other buildings within Pokagon State Park were constructed by the CCC during their stay from 1934 to 1942, including the Gate House (1936), Spring Shelter (1937), and the Saddle Barn (1938), and the first incarnations of the tobaggon run.

The CCC Shelter was added to the National Register of Historic Places in 1992.

Notes

Civilian Conservation Corps in Indiana
Park buildings and structures on the National Register of Historic Places in Indiana
Buildings and structures completed in 1936
Buildings and structures in Steuben County, Indiana
National Register of Historic Places in Steuben County, Indiana
National Park Service Rustic architecture